The Commons at Federal Way (formerly SeaTac Mall) is a regional shopping mall located in Federal Way, Washington, and is the only indoor shopping center in the city. The previous owners, Steadfast Commercial Properties, changed the name to The Commons at Federal Way. Improvements to the shopping center in 2008 were expected to improve sales upon an expected $25 to $30 per square foot ($250–300/m2) by year's end. Steadfast Companies later sold the mall to San Francisco-based Merlone Geier Partners for $46.5 million in March 2017. The mall has over 90 stores. The anchor stores are Dick's Sporting Goods, Daiso, Century Theatres, Kohl's, and Target. There are two vacant anchor stores that were previously occupied by Sears and Macy's.

The original developer was Harry Newman of Newman Properties. SeaTac Mall opened in 1975 on a forested, swampy pasture that was the homestead of Mabel Webb Alexander, who arrived in Washington in 1879 and died at age 96. For many years the original SeaTac Mall used a thunderbird in the logo and had a mascot, Thudius T. Thunderbird.

The original Cinnabon opened at SeaTac Mall in December 1985. However, Cinnabon does not currently operate a location in the mall.

On January 4, 2018, it was announced that Sears would be closing as part of a plan to close 103 stores nationwide. The store closed in April 2018.

On January 6, 2021, it was announced that Macy's would be closing in April 2021 as part of a plan to close 46 stores nationwide.

On April 28, 2022, Dick's Drive-In announced that it would open a new location at the mall in 2023.

References

External links
 The Commons at Federal Way official site

Federal Way, Washington
Shopping malls in King County, Washington
Shopping malls established in 1975
1975 establishments in Washington (state)